Gaia Sabbatini (10 June 1999) is an Italian middle distance runner. She won the gold medal in the 1500 metres at the 2021 European Under-23 Championships. Sabbatini is the Italian indoor record holder for the 1000 metres.

She won three Italian national titles at senior level.

In February 2020, in graduating absolute Italian champion, Gaia Sabbatini became the first athlete from Teramo to conquer a national title.

She represented Italy at the postponed 2020 Tokyo Olympics in 2021, competing in the 1500 metres.

At the 2022 European Cross Country Championships on home soil in Turin, Sabbatini ran the anchor leg of the mixed 4 x 1500 m relay, securing Italy first ever victory in this event.

Achievements

International competitions

National titles
 Italian Athletics Indoor Championships
 800 metres: 2022
 1500 metres: 2020, 2021

Personal bests
 800 metres – 2:00.75 (Rovereto 2021)
 800 metres indoor – 2:01.07 (Ancona 2022)
 1000 metres – 2:48.06 (Rome 2017)
 1000 metres indoor – 2:38.67 (Birmingham 2022) 
 1500 metres – 4:01.93 (Eugene, OR 2022)
 1500 metres indoor – 4:10.25 (Madrid 2022)
 Mile – 4:31.74 (Milan 2021)

Progression
Key:

See also
 Italian all-time top lists - 800 m
 Italian all-time top lists - 1500 m

Notes

References

External links

 

1999 births
Living people
Italian female middle-distance runners
Athletics competitors of Fiamme Azzurre
People from Teramo
Italian Athletics Championships winners
Athletes (track and field) at the 2020 Summer Olympics
Olympic athletes of Italy
Sportspeople from the Province of Teramo